The Jindong Movie Theater is a movie theater and restaurant in Nanzhuang Township, Miaoli County, Taiwan.

Architecture
The movie theater building is decorated with various movie posters around it. It shows old movies and serves Hakka cuisines.

See also
 Cinema of Taiwan

References

Buildings and structures in Miaoli County
Cinemas in Taiwan